Intelligrated, Inc. (a portmanteau of intelligent and integrated) was a material handling automation and software engineering company based in Mason, Ohio. In 2016, it was acquired by Honeywell, who made it a subsidiary and renamed it to Honeywell Intelligrated. 2017, Honeywell Intelligrated reported revenue of $1 billion. Honeywell Intelligrated has production and service locations in the United States, Canada, India, Mexico, Brazil, and China.

History
Intelligrated was founded in 2001 by Chris Cole and Jim McCarthy, and has its headquarters in Mason, Ohio, a suburb of Cincinnati.

In 2002, Intelligrated acquired the Versa Conveyor product line from Conveyors Ltd. Later that same year, the company opened a new manufacturing facility in London, Ohio. By the end of 2008, Intelligrated employed more than 500 associates, with field operations throughout the U.S.

In 2009, after purchasing the North and South American operations of FKI Logistex, Intelligrated grew to more than 1,500 associates and expanded its product line to include Alvey palletizers, Real Time Solutions order fulfillment systems, as well as tilt-tray and cross-belt sorters.

Following the FKI Logistex acquisition, Intelligrated continued its international growth by expanding its operations in both Canada and Mexico. In 2012, Intelligrated began operations in São Paulo, Brazil.

In August 2012, Intelligrated was acquired by Permira.

In late 2012, Intelligrated completed the acquisition of supply chain software company Knighted and followed that with the March 2013 purchase of Datria Systems, Inc., a provider of voice-enabled solutions for distribution and logistics organizations. The company acquired United Sortation Solutions, Inc. in February 2016, adding vertical conveyor, tote stacking and de-stacking, and other sortation solutions to the growing Intelligrated portfolio.

In August 2016, Honeywell completed its acquisition of Intelligrated in a transaction valued at $1.5 billion, with the company joining Honeywell's Safety and Productivity Solutions business group. To support the integrated path forward as part of Honeywell, Intelligrated was rebranded as Honeywell Intelligrated — capitalizing on the global reach and brand recognition of Honeywell, while leveraging the legacy and reputation of Intelligrated.

Industries served
Honeywell Intelligrated provides solutions for retail, wholesale, e-commerce, food, beverage, consumer packaged goods, pharmaceutical and medical supply, third-party logistics, and postal and parcel industries.

Honeywell Intelligrated designs, builds and installs automated material handling solutions including case and pallet conveyors, IntelliSort sortation systems, Alvey palletizers, robotic systems, order fulfillment systems and advanced machine controls. Honeywell Intelligrated Software offers warehouse execution systems, labor management software, voice and light order fulfillment technologies, and mobility and wireless solutions. The company's Lifecycle Support Services group administers aftermarket services such as technology refresh, equipment modifications, maintenance and system assessments, spare parts strategies and track-driven training. Material handling equipment brands supported by Honeywell Intelligrated include Alvey, Buschman, Cleco, Crisplant, Davco, FKI Logistex, Intelligrated, Mathews Real Time Solutions and Versa material handling systems and machinery. The company also provides operational support services, design and build, solutions development and systems integration services.

References

Companies based in Ohio
Software companies based in Ohio
Defunct software companies of the United States